Intestinal metaplasia is the transformation (metaplasia) of epithelium (usually of the stomach or the esophagus) into a type of epithelium resembling that found in the intestine.  In the esophagus, this is called Barrett's esophagus. Chronic inflammation caused by H. pylori infection in the stomach and GERD in the esophagus are seen as the primary instigators of metaplasia and subsequent adenocarcinoma formation. Initially, the transformed epithelium resembles the small intestine lining; in the later stages it resembles the lining of the colon. It is characterized by the appearance of goblet cells and expression of intestinal cell markers such as the transcription factor, CDX2.

Risk factors
Although it was originally reported that people of East Asian ethnicity with gastric intestinal metaplasia are at increased risk of stomach cancer, it is now clear that gastric intestinal metaplasia is also a risk factor in low-incidence regions like Europe. Risk factors for progression of gastric intestinal metaplasia to full blown cancer are smoking and family history.

References

External links
 AGA Clinical Practice Guidelines on Management of Gastric Intestinal Metaplasia
 Intestinal metaplasia (definition) – mondofacto.com.

Gastrointestinal tract disorders
Types of cancer